Stambaugh Township is a civil township of Iron County in the U.S. state of Michigan. The population was 1,140 according to the 2010 census.

Communities 
 Stambaugh was a city adjacent to the township that merged into the city of Iron River effective July 1, 2000. The area of the former city of Stambaugh was incorporated from land within the township.
 Caspian is a city within the township, but is administratively autonomous.
 Gaastra is a city within the township, but is administratively autonomous.
In 1887, it was a depot on the Chicago and North Western Transportation Company named "Paint River", after the nearby stream. A post office named Paint River was established on November 15, 1887. The spelling of the post office name changed to "Paintriver" on February 8, 1895 and was closed on July 31, 1901. The railroad station had been renamed Elmwood by 1898.

Geography
Stambaugh Township lies along the Michigan-Wisconsin border.

Stambaugh Township has many lakes within its borders. Chicagon Lake, Hagerman Lake, Lake Ottawa, and Brule Lake are in the south and east. Smoky Lake, Golden Lake, and Tamarack Lake are in the west

Climate

Demographics
As of the census of 2000, there were 1,248 people, 523 households, and 384 families residing in the township.  The population density was 6.9 per square mile (2.7/km).  There were 1,312 housing units at an average density of 7.2 per square mile (2.8/km).  The racial makeup of the township was 97.36% White, 0.72% African American, 0.96% Native American, 0.08% from other races, and 0.88% from two or more races. Hispanic or Latino of any race were 0.16% of the population. 18.9% were of German, 11.7% Italian, 10.1% Polish, 9.8% Finnish, 9.2% Swedish, 7.3% French, 6.1% Irish, 5.4% English and 5.3% Norwegian ancestry according to Census 2000.

There were 523 households, out of which 22.9% had children under the age of 18 living with them, 65.8% were married couples living together, 4.6% had a female householder with no husband present, and 26.4% were non-families. 23.5% of all households were made up of individuals, and 11.5% had someone living alone who was 65 years of age or older.  The average household size was 2.32 and the average family size was 2.69.

In the township the population was spread out, with 18.6% under the age of 18, 5.2% from 18 to 24, 21.9% from 25 to 44, 31.2% from 45 to 64, and 23.2% who were 65 years of age or older.  The median age was 48 years. For every 100 females, there were 108.3 males.  For every 100 females age 18 and over, there were 106.1 males.

The median income for a household in the township was $37,656, and the median income for a family was $44,750. Males had a median income of $29,286 versus $23,750 for females. The per capita income for the township was $20,997.  About 2.5% of families and 6.7% of the population were below the poverty line, including 11.2% of those under age 18 and 4.7% of those age 65 or over.

References

Townships in Iron County, Michigan
Townships in Michigan